The arts of the Spanish Baroque include:

Spanish Baroque painting
Spanish Baroque architecture
 Spanish Baroque ephemeral architecture
Spanish Baroque literature
Culteranismo
Conceptismo
Spanish Baroque art
Bodegón
Tenebrism
Cuzco School
Indochristian art
Quito School
:Category:Spanish Baroque painters
Spanish Baroque music 
New Spanish Baroque
Andean Baroque
Baroque Churches of the Philippines

See also
Spanish Golden Age
Baroque music

Spanish Baroque